Rose Schlösinger (5 October 1907 – 5 August 1943) was a German social worker and resistance fighter against the Nazi regime. She was associated with the Red Orchestra (Rote Kapelle) resistance group and passed along encrypted messages from Arvid Harnack. She was arrested in October 1942, sentenced to death by the Reich War Tribunal, and executed in August 1943.

Early life and family
Rose Ennenbach was born in Frankfurt am Main on 5 October 1907 to a working-class family. She was raised by a single mother, Sophie Ennenbach, who had some prominence as a member of the Social Democratic Party. Rose was active with the Socialist Workers Youth Party (Sozialistischen Arbeiterjugend) and studied to be a kindergarten teacher, training in childcare and job counseling at the Frankfurt Welfare School. She married Friedrich Heinemann and in January 1932 gave birth to their daughter, Marianne. They divorced soon afterwards and Rose returned to live with her mother. She interned with a social station after passing her exams, but was unable to gain employment as a social worker after the Nazi Party rose to power in 1933. She then learned shorthand and secured a job as a typist at the Wanderer Continental Typewriter Works in Chemnitz.

Resistance during World War II
In 1936 Rose married Bodo Schlösinger, a translator who was part of an anti-Nazi group headed by Arvid Harnack. The pair aided the underground resistance and by 1937 she was working with communists from Berlin associated with the Red Orchestra. She forwarded encrypted messages from Harnack to radio operator Hans Coppi. After the resistance group was discovered by Nazi intelligence, she was arrested in October 1942. The Reich War Tribunal gave her a death sentence on 20 January 1943. Her husband killed himself after learning of the sentence. Schlösinger was beheaded with a guillotine on 5 August 1943 at Plötzensee Prison in Berlin.

In 1969, Schlösinger was posthumously awarded the Soviet Order of the Red Star.

Farewell letter
Shortly before her execution, Schlösinger wrote a farewell letter to her daughter Marianne.

See also
People of the Red Orchestra

References

Further reading

1907 births
1943 deaths
Red Orchestra (espionage)
German social workers
Executed German women
Executed communists in the German Resistance
People condemned by Nazi courts
People executed for treason against Germany
People executed by guillotine at Plötzensee Prison
Recipients of the Order of the Red Star